Mohammed Iyad Ghaleb Yamin (born 19 September 1994) is a Palestinian footballer who plays as a midfielder for Hilal Al-Quds and Palestine national football team.

International goals

References

1994 births
Living people
Palestinian footballers
Sportspeople from Tel Aviv
Association football midfielders
Thaqafi Tulkarem players
Hilal Al-Quds Club players
Shabab Al-Khalil SC players
Palestine international footballers
West Bank Premier League players
Arab citizens of Israel